Alma Downtown Historic District may refer to:

Alma Downtown Historic District (Alma, Kansas), listed on the National Register of Historic Places (NRHP) in Waubaunsee County
Alma Downtown Historic District (Alma, Michigan), NRHP-listed in Gratiot County

See also
Alma Historic District, in Alma, Wisconsin.